Azerbaijan participates at the Universiade.

Medal count

Medals by Summer Universiade
Azerbaijan has won 40 medals in appearances at the Summer Universiade and is at the 41st rank in the all-time Summer Universiade medal table.

Medals by Winter Universiade
Azerbaijan has won 1 medal in appearances at the Winter Universiade and are at the 40th rank in the all-time Summer Universiade medal table.

Medals by sport

See also
Azerbaijan at the Olympics
Azerbaijan at the Paralympics

References

External links
 FISU History at the FISU

 
Nations at the Universiade
Student sport in Azerbaijan